The Livonian campaign against Rus' was a military campaign that lasted from 1240 to 1242, and was carried out by the Teutonic Knights of the Livonian Order with the aim to conquer the lands of Pskov and Novgorod and convert them to Catholicism.

Origins of the conflict 
The conflict between Novgorod and Teutonic Knights began in 1210, when the knights attacked the Estonians. Novgorod campaigned against the Livonians in 1217, 1219, 1222, and 1223, facing repeated failure. In 1224, the knights captured Dorpat (now Tartu). Soon after the capture of Dorpat, an internal conflict arose in Novgorod. The townspeople refused to help in the fight against the knights. Soon, a split occurred among the Novgorod nobles. Expelled from the city, the nobles and the Knights captured Izborsk in 1233, but soon were expelled from the city by the Pskov army. A year later, Yaroslav Vsevolodovich of Novgorod returned to the Livonian lands and devastated the outskirts of the town Odenpa, triumphing over Emajõe and forcing the Livonians to sign a peace agreement.

In 1236, Lithuania had lost a Great Master of the Order of the Sword Volquin von Winterstein, and Pope Gregory IX gave his consent to the Union of the Order of the Sword with the Teutonic Knights. The master of the Order was Hermann von Balk. In December 1237, Pope Gregory IX proclaimed the second crusade against Finland. Danish king Waldemar II and the joint Masters of the Order agreed to divide Estonia and attacked Baltic Russia in June 1238 in collaboration with the Swedes. The Russian lands were weakened by the Mongol invasion.

First stage 1240-1241 
In July 1240, the Swedish commanders Jarl Birger and Ulf Fassi attempted to invade Novgorod land under the pretext of exterminating the Gentiles. Subordinating the tribes and some EMI, the Swedes believed in a quick and easy victory over the Russians, whose troops had been defeated by the Mongols. However, Prince Alexander, without requesting assistance from Vladimir nor collecting all of the Novgorod militia, managed to intercept the Swedes at the mouth of the Izhora river. On July 15, 1240, Alexander's army camp was attacked by the Swedes. Known as the Battle of Neva, the Novgorod defeated the Swedes. In August, the Livonian knights captured the town of Izborsk and arrived at the outskirts of Pskov, beginning a siege. The knights managed to bribe the Governor of the Pskov, Tverdila, and he opened the gates of the city. The townspeople tried to resist but, in the end, had to surrender.

End of the campaign
In the winter of 1240/1241, the Novgorodians took Pereyaslavl-Zalessky. After, the Teutonic knights constructed the fortress of Koporye, where they kept all their supplies, and took the Novgorod city of Tesov, pillaging its merchants and ravaging the surrounding area. The Novgorodians, fearing a fate similar to that of Pskov, sent envoys to Prince Yaroslav. Yaroslav liked Alexander's younger brother Andrew as a leader, but Novgorod insisted on Alexander.

Alexander returned to Novgorod and commanded its army to Koporye in 1241. In the Spring of 1242, he recaptured Pskov. After this victory, Alexander decided to continue his campaign..

On April 5, 1242, one of Russia's most famous battles, the Battle of the Ice, took place on the ice of Lake Peipus. The battle was a significant defeat sustained by the crusaders during the Northern Crusades. The crusaders' defeat in the battle marked the end of their campaigns against the Orthodox Novgorod Republic and other Russian territories for the next century.

Results 
The Germans withdrew from Pskov and Novgorod. Under the terms of the peace treaty, the Livonians pledged to return to Novgorod Luga, Latgale and the land of the Votes. Novgorod managed to foil the Livonian attempts to conquer the lands of Rus.

References

 Razin E. A. the History of military art
 The struggle of Rus ' with German military-religious orders
 Jankov A. N. Between two evils. The historical choice of Alexander Nevsky

External links
 The Older Livonian Rhymed Chronicle

1240s in Europe
13th century in Russia
Conflicts involving the Livonian Order
13th-century crusades
Invasions of Russia
Pskov Republic
Novgorod Republic
Conflicts in 1240
Conflicts in 1241
Conflicts in 1242